Ras Alula Engida (1827 – 15 February 1897; also known by his horse name Abba Nega and by Alula Qubi) was an Ethiopian general and politician who successfully led Abyssinian battles against Ottoman Egypt, the Mahdists and Italy. He was one of the most important leaders of the Abyssinian  forces during the 19th century. Ras Alula Described by Haggai Erlich as the "greatest leader whom Ethiopia produced since the death of Emperor Tewodros II in 1868." Ras Alula was referred to by Europeans as "the Garibaldi of Ethiopia".

Early years 
Alula was born in Mennewe, a village in Tembien,the son of Engda Eqube, a farmer of modest origins. Haggai Erlich relates a story about Alula's childhood – "well known throughout Tigray": a group of people carrying baskets of bread to a wedding ceremony were stopped by a group of children led by the future Ras, who demanded to know where they were going. "To the Castle of Ras Alula Wadi Qubi," they mockingly replied. "Thereafter," concludes Erlich, "his friends and the people of Mannawe nicknamed him Ras Alula."

At first Alula attached himself to the distinguished Ras Araya Dimtsu, hereditary chief of Enderta who was lord of the land his father farmed; before long he gained the attention of Ras Araya's successful nephew, Dejazmach Kassa Mercha (the future emperor Yohannes IV), who made him his elfegn kalkay ("chamberlain and doorkeeper"). Erlich records an oral tradition that the young Alula distinguished himself by being the one who captured king Tekle Giyorgis in the battle of Assem where Emperor Yohannes crushed his opponent (11 July 1871). In spite of his humble background, Alula succeeded in climbing the ladder of the feudal hierarchy.

He had three children by his first wife Woizero B'tweta. However, in order to enhance his position at the Imperial court, he divorced his wife and married Woizero Amlesu Araya, daughter of Ras Araya Dimtsu, the powerful and much respected uncle of Emperor Yohannes IV. His second marriage was purely for political reasons, to improve his legitimacy with the local aristocracy, who did not hide their disapproval at seeing the son of a peasant reach this stature.

Alula demonstrated his military skill in the Battle of Gundet and Gura, which were fought in November 1875 and March 1876 respectively, where he routed the Egyptian forces. Emperor Yohannes badly needed a man with these skills at the moment, for Ras Woldemichael Solomon was in revolt in Hamasien; Alula was promoted to Ras and sent to deal with this unruly aristocrat, who fled to Bogos. On 9 October 1876, the Emperor made Alula governor of Mereb Mellash and Midri Bahri (today part of Eritrea).

Battle of Kufit 
In the Hewett Treaty, concluded in 1884, the United Kingdom recognized Bogos and Massawa as possessions of Ethiopia in return for Ras Alula's help evacuating the Egyptian garrisons of Amedeb, Algeden, Keren, Ghirra, and Gallabat which had been isolated by the Mahdists, and because of these successes the British once more asked for his help against the Mahdists under Osman Digna.

Ras Alula prepared for his campaign against the Mahdists, despite the opposition of certain local leaders who did not accept his rule. Nevertheless, Alula advanced into the territory of the Bogos, then entered Keren in September 1885, where he stayed for ten days, then marched on Kufit.

At Kufit, Osman Digna's forces were annihilated, but the Ethiopians also suffered significant losses: the commanders Blatta Gebru and Aselafi Hagos were killed, and Ras Alula himself was wounded.

Battle of Dogali 

However events beyond the Horn of Africa gave Ras Alula very little time to recover from the battle. As part the European Scramble for Africa, at this time the Italians took control of the Red Sea coasts, occupying Massawa and Saati with the tacit approval of the British, which was a violation of the Hewett Treaty.

Although he had collaborated with the British against the Mahdists, Ras Alula chief interest was to guarantee Ethiopian sovereignty, which made him very wary towards the English who he suspected supported the Italians' encroachments. His mistrust is clearly expressed in a conversation carried out with Augustus B. Wylde, the former British vice consul at Jeddah, who recorded these words in a dispatch to the Manchester Guardian:

Upon returning to Asmara, Alula mobilized 5,000 men and marched from Ghinda towards Saati. It is unclear whether Ras Alula was acting on his own initiative in this instance, or at the orders of his Emperor. Discussing the battle later, he insisted that he was following orders; contemporary Ethiopian documents support Ras Alula's claim. However, in a 9 March 1887 letter to Queen Victoria, Emperor Yohannes wrote that his general had first spent two weeks investigating the Italian presence, then demanded that the Italians either evacuate their positions outside of Massawa or fight.

Before attacking the Italians, he notified Emperor Yohannes of his intentions, which is expressed to Harrison, who had accompanied the admiral Hewett during the negotiations of the treaty, declaring to him that the British had not honored their word.

To Marcopolo Bey Ras Alula wrote that the Italians were in Massawa, and to the Consul Sumagn de France, he warned that he would destroy the Italian forces if they did not leave Abyssinian territory. But the Italians believed that it was "the divine will that the Italians come to Massawa". In October 1886, the forces of Alula appeared near Saati and Massawa.

By December 1886, confrontation with the Italians was inevitable. The first clash took place 25 January 1887 at Saati, where the Ethiopians were repulsed with heavy casualties; Alula rallied his troops and the next day annihilated the Italian relief column at Dogali. The commander of the Italian forces, colonel Tommaso De Cristoforis was killed in this battle, along with 400 soldiers and 22 officers.

Battle of Gallabat 

By 1888 the Sudanese Italians and dervishes were ready to renew their attacks. In March 1889, the Battle of Gallabat (also known as the Battle of Metemma) was fought on the western Ethiopian border. Here, the forces of the Mahdi were nearly obliterated, however, Emperor Yohannes was wounded and died the next day. Emperor Yohannes' death led to a period of political turmoil in Ethiopia. Meanwhile, Ras Alula found himself isolated, his patron dead, and the steady Italian advance from the coast having deprived him of his power base beyond the Mareb River.

Menelik II of Shewa was crowned emperor only a few months after the battle. The Italian Count Pietro Antonelli, who represented his country in Ethiopia, hastened to Wuchale where he negotiated a treaty with Menelik, which gave official Ethiopia recognition to Italian possession of all of the land the Italians occupied. A few months later, they used this treaty to declare Eritrea their African colony.

Battle of Adwa 

Following the Treaty of Wuchale, the Italians continued to extend to the west not only around Teseney and Agordat, but also around Adwa. Unknown to Emperor Menelik, the Italian version of the treaty had language making Ethiopia a protectorate of Italy, and the Italian actions were in preparation for its enforcement on his empire and making it a colony. When Emperor Menelik learned of this treachery, he renounced the treaty which led to the First Italo-Abyssinian War, and as the bitter news spreads through Ethiopia the major nobility and military figures, including Ras Alula, unanimously joined him. The conflict has its climax at the Battle of Adwa on 1 March 1896.

In this battle, Alula was on the left side of the Ethiopian positions, on the heights of Adi Abune, supported by soldiers of Ras Makonnen, and Ras Mikael. The forces of Ras Sebhat of Agame and Dejazmach Hagos Tafari likewise joined Ras Alula and Ras Mengesha.

Augustus Wylde, a contemporary of the events, described Ras Alula's invaluable contribution to this critical battle:

During the Battle of Adwa, Ras Alula was assigned to watch the Gasgorie Pass and block the arrival of Italian reinforcements coming from Adi Quala. Ras Alula's role in the battle itself is not known. He had only a small force, and probably played a limited part in the actual fighting.

Death
Ras Alula could not rest after this victory; less than a year later, on 15 January 1897, he fought against an old rival, Ras Hagos of Tembien. Although Ras Alula was victorious and Ras Hagos killed, Ras Alula suffered a gunshot wound to the leg, and died on 15 February 1897.

Legacy 

Ras Alula holds a special place in Ethiopian history as the greatest military mind the country has ever produced. The airport in Mek'ele is named after Ras Alula, and an equestrian statue is dedicated to him in that city. A hotel in Axum also bears his name. Ethiopian scholar Richard Pankhurst named his son, Dr. Alula Pankhurst, after Ras Alula.

References

Further reading 

 "Ras Alula, the Abyssinian" 12 April 1887 New York Times article
 "Ras Alula dead, An Abyssinian General of Great Ability – The Son of Peasants" 27 February 1897 New York Times article By Abebe Ataro Z Dawuro

External links 
 Ras Alula Abba Nega: An Ethiopian and African Hero by Ghelawdewos Araia

History of Eritrea
1827 births
1897 deaths
19th-century military personnel
Dogu'a Tembien